The Genoa–Milan railway is a major Italian rail line, connecting the cities of Genoa and Milan. Passenger traffic is managed by Trenitalia.

History 

Unlike the Turin-Genoa line, the Milan-Genoa line was not built as a single project. Instead it developed from the joining of different lines by a shortcut. The first part of the line from Milan to Genoa is the section from Milano Rogoredo to Pavia, which was opened on 10 May 1862 as a branch off the line from Milano Centrale to Piacenza, opened on 14 November 1861. Earlier, on 25 January 1858, the Alessandria-Tortona-Voghera-Casteggio line opened to the public along with the connection between Tortona and Novi Ligure, providing good connections to the by now completed Turin-Genoa line. On 14 November 1867 the opening to traffic of the rail link from Pavia to Voghera completed the link between Milan and Genoa.

The section between Genoa and Novi Ligure over the Giovi Pass used by both the Turin-Genoa and the Milan-Genoa lines, however, was extremely difficult and therefore a new link between Arquata Scrivia and Tortona was built which was opened on 1 October 1916, completing the current form of the line, except for improvements made in Genoa and the deviation opened in 2007 between Milan Rogoredo and Locate Triulzi replacing the 1862 route.

High speed line 

The Tortona–Genoa high-speed railway (also known as the "third Giovi pass") project has been under development to bypass the mountainous and more congested southern section of the line since 1991. This line is forecast to open in 2025.

See also 
 List of railway lines in Italy

References

Footnotes

Sources
 }
 
 
 
 }

Railway lines in Liguria
Railway lines in Lombardy
Railway lines in Piedmont
Railway lines opened in 1867